Carl Abbott is a Fellow of the American Institute of Architects and the youngest member of the original Sarasota School of Architecture.

After receiving his bachelor's degree from the University of Florida, Abbott earned his Masters at Yale University under the renowned Paul Rudolph (architect). After graduating from Yale, Abbott worked with Richard Rogers and Norman Foster at TEAM 4 in London, then worked in the office of I.M. Pei in New York City before founding his own practice in Sarasota, Florida, in 1966.

In his own practice, Abbott's first design was the Weld Beach House in Boca Grande. This design established his exploration of geometry and sculptural forms within a clear concept responding directly to the site. This project began Abbott's wide recognition in Floridian and National Architectural Press.

Abbott's award-winning body of projects include the Casa del Cielo, Lido Bayfront House, Putterman Residence, Artist's Family Compound, Caribbean Hilltop Residence, Saint Thomas More Catholic Church, among many others. Abbott has the highest number of Test of Time Awards given in the Florida / Caribbean Region for “Designs of Enduring Significance”.

In addition to his active architectural practice, Abbott is also a speaker on the architecture of past civilizations, most notably the Maya, where he has worked extensively to document and uncover the significant spatial mastery of the ancient culture.

In the book IN/FORMED by THE LAND, architecture critic Michael Sorkin wrote of Carl Abbott's work, “Project after project delivers on the modernist ideal of eliding inside and out creating the illusion of the natural flowing untrammeled through the constructed…a sequence of shifts both tactile and tectonic that create a richly compact journey in which spaces move to arrive at moments of expansiveness and relaxation both.”

Yale classmate Richard Rogers said of Abbott's work, “His buildings are sensitive to context, express a spare poetry without ever becoming austere, and have a unique beauty…the result is buildings that are works of art.” 

Abbott will be the focus of the Sarasota Architectural Foundation's 2020 SarasotaMOD Weekend.

References

External links 
www.carlabbott.com

Living people
University of Florida alumni
Yale School of Architecture alumni
Year of birth missing (living people)
Place of birth missing (living people)
Architects from Florida
People from Sarasota, Florida